Catalina of Motril (fl. 1501–1531), was an enslaved Moorish royal bedchamber servant.

Life
Catalina of Motril was born in Motril in Granada. Sometime before 1501 she was enslaved, likely during the Spanish reconquista. She was given the Christian name Catalina, after Catherine of Aragon, when she converted to Christianity, as was the custom practised by both Christian and Muslim slave owners at the time. There were two anonymous 'esclavas' (slaves) listed in Catherine's entourage when she travelled to England in 1501 to marry Arthur, Prince of Wales. Catalina is likely to have been one of these two. She was referred to as 'Catalina, once the Queen’s slave' over 30 years later, after she had left Catherine's service. Catalina’s exact status in the service of Catherine of Aragon is unknown. As slavery was illegal in England at that time, her enslavement would in effect no longer have been considered legal after her arrival to England.  

Catalina was still a part of Catherine's household in 1509, as the Spanish Ambassador noted that she witnessed the first intercourse between Catherine of Aragon and Henry VIII after their marriage that year. In 1531, when Henry VIII issued an investigation to obtain a divorce from Catherine, Catalina was called to testify that Catherine had not been a virgin on her wedding night. It was stated that at some point, she had returned to Spain, where she had married the bow maker Oviedo, with whom she had two daughters, and lived with him in Málaga, and that in 1531, she was a widow living in Motril. It is unknown whether she attended the court to testify.

References 

English courtiers
15th-century people from al-Andalus
People of the Reconquista
Converts to Roman Catholicism from Islam
Year of birth unknown
Year of death unknown
Women of the Emirate of Granada
15th-century slaves
16th-century slaves
15th-century Spanish women
16th-century Spanish women
Household of Catherine of Aragon